β-Hydroxy β-methylglutaryl-CoA (HMG-CoA), also known as 3-hydroxy-3-methylglutaryl coenzyme A, is an intermediate in the mevalonate and ketogenesis pathways. It is formed from acetyl CoA and acetoacetyl CoA by HMG-CoA synthase. The research of Minor J. Coon and Bimal Kumar Bachhawat in the 1950s at University of Illinois led to its discovery.

HMG-CoA is a metabolic intermediate in the metabolism of the branched-chain amino acids, which include leucine, isoleucine, and valine. Its immediate precursors are β-methylglutaconyl-CoA (MG-CoA) and β-hydroxy β-methylbutyryl-CoA (HMB-CoA).

HMG-CoA reductase catalyzes the conversion of HMG-CoA to mevalonic acid, a necessary step in the biosynthesis of cholesterol.

Biosynthesis

Mevalonate pathway 

Mevalonate synthesis begins with the beta-ketothiolase-catalyzed Claisen condensation of two molecules of acetyl-CoA to produce acetoacetyl CoA. The following reaction involves the joining of acetyl-CoA and acetoacetyl-CoA to form HMG-CoA, a process catalyzed by HMG-CoA synthase.

In the final step of mevalonate biosynthesis, HMG-CoA reductase, an NADPH-dependent oxidoreductase, catalyzes the conversion of HMG-CoA into mevalonate, which is the primary regulatory point in this pathway. Mevalonate serves as the precursor to isoprenoid groups that are incorporated into a wide variety of end-products, including cholesterol in humans.

Ketogenesis pathway 
HMG-CoA lyase breaks it into acetyl CoA and acetoacetate.

See also 
 Steroidogenic enzyme

References 

Thioesters of coenzyme A